Sima Yu (司馬遹) (278 – 27 April 300), courtesy name Xizu (熙祖), posthumous name Crown Prince Minhuai (愍懷太子), was a crown prince of the Chinese Western Jin dynasty.

Sima Yu's father Sima Zhong was developmentally disabled, and before he, then crown prince, was to marry his wife Jia Nanfeng, Zhong's father Emperor Wu gave him one of his own concubines, Consort Xie Jiu, so that Consort Xie could teach him how to have sexual relations. While Crown Princess Jia bore the crown prince four daughters, Sima Yu was his only son.

When Sima Yu was four years old, there was a fire in the palace, and Emperor Wu walked up a tower to observe it. Sima Yu pulled him aside and said, "At night, when something unusual like this happens, we should take precautions. The light of the fire should not shine on the emperor." Emperor Wu was surprised by this perceptive observation by a child, and praised the young prince as very much like his own grandfather Sima Yi. This was part of the reason why Emperor Wu let Crown Prince Zhong remain his heir. On 22 December 289, he created Prince Yu the Prince of Guangling. After Emperor Wu died in May 290, Crown Prince Zhong ascended the throne as Emperor Hui, and Prince Yu was created crown prince at the age of 12.

As Crown Prince Yu grew in age, however, he lost some of the good reputation that he had as a child, as he disliked studying and spent much time on building projects and games. Empress Jia, who had constantly been jealous of Crown Prince Yu and Consort Xie, did not discourage this behavior, but in fact encouraged it to further damage Crown Prince Yu's reputation.  When Crown Prince Yu's staff would try to correct his ways, he would not listen to them.  He also would not listen to them with regard to their advice to maintain strong relations with Empress Jia's family members. Empress Jia's mother Guo Huai had constantly advised Empress Jia to treat Crown Prince Yu well, as her own son, and she advocated marrying a daughter of Empress Jia's sister Jia Wu to Crown Prince Yu. However, Empress Jia and Jia Wu opposed this, and instead married a daughter of the official Wang Yan to Crown Prince Yu. (Wang had two daughters, but Empress Jia had Crown Prince Yu marry the less beautiful one and had her nephew Jia Mi marry the more beautiful one.) After Lady Guo's death, the relationship between Empress Jia and Crown Prince Yu quickly deteriorated, as Jia Wu and another associate of Empress Jia, Emperor Wu's concubine Consort Zhao Can, provoked difficulties between them. Further, Crown Prince Yu and Jia Mi never liked each other, and Jia Mi, as a result, also advised Empress Jia to depose Crown Prince Yu.

In 299, Empress Jia agreed and took action. When Crown Prince Yu was in the palace to make an official petition to have his ill son Sima Bin created a prince, Empress Jia forced him to drink a large amount of wine and, once he was drunk, had him write out a statement in which he declared intention to murder the emperor and the empress and to take over as emperor. Empress Jia presented the writing to the officials and initially wanted Crown Prince Yu executed—but after some resistance, she only had him deposed and reduced to status of a commoner on 6 February 300. On the same day, Crown Prince Yu's mother Consort Xie was executed; his favorite concubine Consort Jiang Jun (蔣俊, Sima Bin's mother) was also executed. Wang Yan divorced his daughter from the crown prince, who wrote an extant, lengthy letter to her explaining the incident through which Empress Jia framed him.

In April 300, under the advice of a prince she favored -- Sima Lun the Prince of Zhao, Emperor Wu's uncle—Empress Jia decided to eliminate Crown Prince Yu as a threat. She sent assassins and had Crown Prince Yu assassinated.  He was buried with honors due a prince—under the title of Prince of Guanling.  Sima Lun's intent was, however, to use this assassination as excuse to overthrow Empress Jia, and he did so later that year.  He had Crown Prince Yu reburied with the honors due a crown prince and had him given the posthumous name Minhuai.  He also welcomed Crown Princess Wang back to the palace, along with Crown Prince Yu's surviving sons Sima Zang (whom he had created crown prince) and Sima Shang. However, when Sima Lun then usurped the throne briefly in 301, Crown Prince Zang was killed.  After Emperor Hui's restoration later that year, Sima Shang was created crown prince, but died in 302, extinguishing Crown Prince Yu's line.

Family 
Consort and issue(s):
Consort Zhending, of the Wang clan of Langya (贞定妃 琅玡王氏; d.331), personal name Huifeng (惠風) 
Concubine, of the Jing clan (妾蒋氏), personal name Jin (俊)
Sima Bin, Prince of Nanyang (司馬虨 南陽王, d. 300), first son
Sima Zang, Prince Ai of Muyang (司馬臧 晋濮陽哀王, 297 – 11 June 301), second son
Sima Shang, Crown Prince Huaichong (司馬尚 懷沖太孫, 300 – 302), third son
Beauty, of the Feng clan (封美人)

References

 Fang, Xuanling. Book of Jin (Jin Shu).

278 births
300 deaths
Jin dynasty (266–420) imperial princes
Executed Jin dynasty (266–420) people
People executed by the Jin dynasty (266–420)
3rd-century executions
People executed by blunt trauma
People from Luoyang
Executed people from Henan
Heirs apparent who never acceded